Orwasher's Bakery is a famous breadmaking business in New York City that has been listed among the top ten bakeries in America. Also known as A. Orwasher Handmade Bread Inc. it was established in 1916 on 78th Street in the Yorkville area of the New York City borough of Manhattan and it is now one of the last vestiges of the thriving immigrant population that lived in that area around the start of the 20th century.

History 
An Eastern European immigrant himself, Abraham Orwasher opened the store in 1916, and lived in a small apartment in the back. Orwasher "used family recipes for the high-quality rye, black, and grain breads of their homeland, baking them all in a basement brick oven and delivering the loaves by horse and carriage." It soon became a thriving wholesale business with deliveries being made by horse and buggy. Abraham's son Louis would go on to take over the business from his father, owning the building the bakery was housed in. Louis would go on to perfect the formulas of his father, while reinventing the breads sold. It is claimed that it was Louis who invented raisin pumpernickel bread, at Orwasher's during World War II.

Abram Orwasher, Louis's son, later took over the business, using the same brick ovens and sourdough starter that was used in 1916. 

In 2007, Mr. Orwasher sold the bakery to Keith Cohen, who stated plans to expand the bakery's offerings beyond Eastern European breads, adding artisanal breads from Italy, France, Ireland and the United States.

Starting in 2009, Keith Cohen launched a new line of Artisan Wine Breads under the brand name Oven Artisans. These breads were created with a wine grape starter in collaboration with Channing Daughters Vineyard in Long Island.

References

External links
 Official site

Food and drink companies established in 1916
Food and drink companies based in New York City
Bakeries of the United States
Companies based in Manhattan